Myres may refer to:

Myres S. McDougal (1906–1998), Sterling Professor of International Law at the Yale Law School
Alexander Myres (born 1996), American football cornerback
Helen Alice Myres (1911–2010), the first major child star of American silent films
John Myres Kt OBE FBA FRAI (1869–1954), British archaeologist and academic
Nowell Myres FBA FSA CBE (1902–1989), British archaeologist and Bodley's Librarian at the Bodleian Library in Oxford
Sandra Myres (1933–1991), American historian of the American Southwest
Thomas Myres FRIBA (1842–1926), English railway architect

See also
Myres Castle, Scottish castle situated in Fife near the village of Auchtermuchty
John Scrimgeour of Myres Castle, Master of Work for royal buildings for James V and Mary, Queen of Scots
Myre (disambiguation)
Miers (disambiguation)